Sir Alan Howard Cottrell, FRS (17 July 1919 – 15 February 2012) was an English metallurgist and physicist. He was also former Chief Scientific Advisor to the UK Government and vice-chancellor of Cambridge University 1977–1979.

Early life
Cottrell was educated at Moseley Grammar School and the University of Birmingham, where he gained a Bachelor of Science degree in 1939 and a PhD for research on welding in 1942.

Career
Cottrell joined the staff as a lecturer at Birmingham, being made professor in 1949, and transforming the teaching of the department by emphasising modern concepts of solid state physics. In 1955 he moved to A.E.R.E. Harwell, to become Deputy Head of Metallurgy under Monty Finniston.

From 1958 to 1965 Cottrell was Goldsmiths' Professor of Metallurgy at Cambridge University, and a fellow of Christ's College. He later worked for the government in various capacities, ultimately as Chief Scientific Adviser from 1971 to 1974, before becoming Master of Jesus College, Cambridge, from 1973 to 1986, and Vice-Chancellor of the university in 1977–1979.

Death
Cottrell died on 15 February 2012 after a brief illness.

Awards and honours
1955 Elected a Fellow of the Royal Society 
1961 Hughes Medal 
1962 Francis J. Clamer Medal
1963 Royal Society Bakerian Medal
1965 He was the first to be awarded the A. A. Griffith Medal and Prize.
1967 James Alfred Ewing Medal.
1969 Fernand Holweck Medal and Prize
1971 He was knighted. 
1973 Honorary Degree (Doctor of Science) from the University of Bath.
1974 James Douglas Gold Medal 
1982 Cottrell was awarded an honorary doctorate from the University of Essex
1996 Copley Medal (the Royal Society's highest award)

He was a member of the Royal Swedish Academy of Sciences.

Selected books 
 Theoretical Structural Metallurgy (1948) (E Arnold; 2nd Revised edition (1 January 1955))
 Dislocations and Plastic Flows in Crystals (1953)
 Superconductivity (1964) (Harwood Academic (Medical, Reference and Social Sc; n edition (December 1964))
 An Introduction to Metallurgy (1967)
 Portrait of Nature : the world as seen by modern science (1975)
 How Safe is Nuclear Energy? (1982) (Heinemann Educational Publishers (29 June 1981))
 Concepts in the Electron Theory of Alloys (1998)

See also
Creep (deformation)

References

External links
The National Archives lists his reports
 Listen to an oral history interview with Sir Alan Cottrell – a life story interview recorded for An Oral History of British Science at the British Library
 Tribute by Prof Peter Hirsch
 Obituary, The Daily Telegraph, 19 February 2012
 Obituary by Dr J.A. Charles
 AIME James Douglas Gold Medal in 1974  Biography at The American Institute of Mining, Metallurgical, and Petroleum Engineers.

1919 births
2012 deaths
British metallurgists
British physicists
Fellows of the Royal Society
Foreign associates of the National Academy of Sciences
Members of the Royal Swedish Academy of Sciences
Alumni of the University of Birmingham
Academics of the University of Birmingham
Fellows of Christ's College, Cambridge
Fellows of Jesus College, Cambridge
Masters of Jesus College, Cambridge
Knights Bachelor
Recipients of the Copley Medal
Chief Scientific Advisers to HM Government
Chief Scientific Advisers to the Ministry of Defence
Vice-Chancellors of the University of Cambridge
People educated at Moseley School
Goldsmiths' Professors of Materials Science